Zac Young (born 1982) is an American pastry chef and TV personality. He has been featured on various baking shows on Food Network and the Cooking Channel, most notably on Top Chef: Just Desserts and Unique Sweets. He also appeared as a guest judge on baking competition show Nailed It! on Netflix, Food Network's Halloween Baking Championship, and Food Network's Chopped.

Early life
Zac Young was born in Portland, Maine, in 1982 in Portland, Maine to Jonathan and Susan Lebel Young. Growing up, he wanted to learn how to bake after his vegan mother never baked cookies for him. After participating in community children's theatre shows from third through eighth grade, Young was admitted to Walnut Hill School for the Arts in Natick, Massachusetts. Young momentarily worked as a costume designer before deciding that baking was his true passion. He then moved to New York City in 2003 to enroll at the Institute of Culinary Education and graduated in 2006.

Career
Following graduation from the Institute of Culinary Education, Young first worked under Sebastien Rouxel and Richard Capizzi at Bouchon Bakery, then accepted a pastry chef position at Butter. Young trained in France with Philippe Givre at Valrhona and Philippe Parc at Michel Cluizel. In 2009, Young became executive pastry chef at Flex Mussels on the Upper East Side, where he ran a seasonal pop-up donut shop in Grand Central Station.

Young joined David Burke Group, later renamed Craveable Hospitality Group, in 2012 as an executive pastry chef. In 2015, Young and David Burke Fabrick's pastry chef, Gian Martinez, originated the PieCaken dessert. PieCaken, originally intended to be sold by the slice in restaurants, is a layered dish of pecan pie, pumpkin pie, and spice cake held together with cinnamon buttercream and topped with apple pie filling. (The Wall Street Journal described the piecaken as "a fusion of a pumpkin pie, a pecan pie and an apple upside down cake".)

Personal life

Young is openly gay.

Filmography

References

External links

Food Network profile

1982 births
American television chefs
Food Network chefs
Gay entertainers
American LGBT entertainers
American gay men
LGBT people from Maine
Living people
American male chefs
Pastry chefs
People from Portland, Maine
Chefs from Maine
LGBT chefs